RoRo or Roro is a nickname and given name. Notable people with this name include the following:

Nickname
 Ró-Ró, nickname of Pedro Miguel Carvalho Deus Correia (born 1990), Qatari footballer
 RoRo, nickname of Roger Fabricio Rojas Lazo, known as Roger Rojas (footballer, born 1990) (born 1990), Honduran footballer
 RoRo, nickname of Rodrigo Roncero (born 1977), Argentinian rugby union player
Ti Roro, nickname of Baillargau Raymond (died c. 1980), known as Ti Roro, was a Haitian drummer
Roro Perrot, nickname of Romain Perrot (born 1973), better known as Vomir, French noise music artist

Given name
Dyah Roro Esti Widya Putri (born 1993), Indonesian politician
Nyai Roro Kidul, Indonesian Goddess of the sea

See also

Ro (name)
Rolo (name)
Rora (name)
Roro (disambiguation)